Nemo Down is a   nature reserve on  the western outskirts of Dover in Kent. It was shown as  owned and managed by the Kent Wildlife Trust until 2018.

This site has chalk grassland, scrub and woodland. There is a diverse range of plants including pyramidal orchids and wood anemones, and butterflies such as the marbled white and wall brown.

There is access, which can be very muddy, on Coombe Road.

References

Nature reserves in Kent